George Frederick Bristow (December 19, 1825 – December 13, 1898) was an American composer.  He advocated American classical music, rather than favoring European pieces.  He was famously involved in a related controversy involving William Henry Fry and the New York Philharmonic Society.

Life and career
Bristow was born into a musical family in Brooklyn, New York.  His father, William, a well-respected conductor, pianist, and clarinetist, gave his son lessons in piano, harmony, counterpoint, orchestration and violin.  George joined the first violin section of the New York Philharmonic Society Orchestra in 1843 at the age of seventeen, and remained there until 1879.  The New York Philharmonic's records indicate that he was concertmaster between 1850 and 1853.

In the 1850s, Bristow became conductor of two choral organizations, the New York Harmonic Society and the Mendelssohn Union (and later several church choirs).  In 1854, he began his long career as a music educator in the public schools of New York.

Throughout his life, Bristow was a champion of American music and a nationalist in his choice of texts.  The amount and quality of his choral music, although mostly ignored by Grove's, makes Bristow a historically important choral composer.

Music

Bristow's compositional output is divided in three periods:  his early years, during which most of the compositions are instrumental; the middle period beginning in 1852, during which he wrote more than forty works, several of them lengthy and imposing;  and the late period, beginning in 1879 with Bristow's resignation from the New York Philharmonic.  Of the 135 compositions listed in Rogers’ dissertation on Bristow's music, one-third are choral or vocal.  Seven of his choral works are choral/orchestral pieces, and twenty-seven compositions are smaller pieces, most of which were composed for church choirs that he led. Both the short sacred works and the large choral/orchestral compositions are evenly divided between the middle and late periods.

Choral/orchestral works

Middle period
Cantata, Eleutheria, 1849
Opera, Rip van Winkle, 1855.
Symphony No. 2 in D minor, ("Jullien"), Op. 24, 1856
Ode, op. 29, first performed, 1856 (soprano solo, women's voices, and orchestra).
Symphony No. 3 in F-sharp minor, op. 26, 1859
Oratorio, Praise to God, op. 31/33, 1860.
The Oratorio of Daniel, op. 42, 1866.
The Pioneer, A Grand Cantata, op. 49, 1872.
Symphony "Arcadian" (The Pioneer), 1872.

Late period
Ode, The Great Republic, op. 47, (words by William Oland Bourne), 1879.
Mass in C Major, op. 57, 1885.

Reception

As the handiwork of an American composer, The Oratorio of Daniel reflects the highest credit to our country in the realms of art, and there are few, if any, composers in Europe at the present day who are capable of writing anything equal to it.

[Daniel] is by far the most masterly work that an American composer has yet produced, and we judge it will rapidly make its way into the accepted repertory.... That it is a remarkable opus and destined to bring the author's name prominently into the list of those whom we delight to term ‘great living composers’ seems clear enough.		

Several reviewers compared the work favorably to Mendelssohn's Elijah. Thirty years later the American Art Journal summed up opinion of this work in Bristow's obituary:

Bristow's oratorio of Daniel is unquestionably one of the most important compositions in this form yet produced by an American composer... From the production of this great work dates a new era in our musical history.
		
This evaluation gains added significance in light of the large number of popular, well-written works that were produced by Americans during the latter half of the nineteenth century: Horatio Parker's Hora novissima (1892) and Legend of St. Christopher (1897), John Knowles Paine's St. Peter (1872) as well as his Mass in D (1867–68), and Amy Beach's Mass in E-flat (1891).

Bristow's The Oratorio of Daniel has been published in full score form by A-R Editions in its "Recent Researches in American Music" series.

Discography 

Arcadian Symphony ("Arcadian symphonie"): The Pioneer, op. 49 [i.e. 50]; Royal Philharmonic Orchestra, Karl Krueger, conductor. Society for the Preservation of the American Musical Heritage, MIA 134, 1967. LP record. 
Symphony No. 2, in D minor, op. 24 ("Jullien"); Royal Philharmonic Orchestra, Karl Krueger, conductor. Society for the Preservation of the American Musical Heritage, MIA 143, 1969. LP record. 
Symphony No. 3 in F♯ minor, op. 26; Royal Philharmonic Orchestra, Karl Krueger, conductor. Society for the Preservation of the American Musical Heritage, MIA 144, 1969. LP record. 
Nocturne and Scherzo from Symphony No. 6 in F♯ minor (along with works by Charles Tomlinson Griffes); Royal Philharmonic Orchestra, Karl Krueger, conductor. Society for the Preservation of the American Musical Heritage, MIA 129, 1966. LP record. 
Symphony No. 3 in F♯ minor, op. 26 (along with Samuel Barber's Symphony No. 2 and Adagio for Strings); Detroit Symphony Orchestra, Neeme Järvi conductor. Chandos, CHAN 9169, 1995. Compact disc. 
Six pieces for organ, op. 45, no. 1 in F major, no. 4 in G minor, no. 6 in C major on The Nineteenth Century.; Janice Beck, organ. Musical Heritage Society, OR A-263, 1970. LP record
The Oratorio of Daniel, op. 42; Keith Kibler, bass-baritone (Daniel); Thomas Paul, bass (Nebuchadnezzar); Beverley Thiele, soprano (Angel); Marguerite Krull, mezzo-soprano (Angel); Steven Tharpe, tenor (Azariah, a Chaldean); Rand Reeves, tenor (Meschach, a Chaldean); Samuel Sommers, bass (Abednego, Arioch, Herald); Catskill Choral Society; Albany Pro Musica; David Griggs-Janower, conductor. Albany Pro Musica, APM-97-1/2, 1997. Compact disc. 
Praise to God. We praise thee, O God [op. 31/33] on 'Nineteenth century American Sacred Music: From Fuging tune to Oratorio. Various artists. Smithsonian Folkways, FTS 32381, 1980. LP record.; reissued Smithsonian Folkways, FTS 32381, 2000. Compact disc. 
Symphony No. 2 in D minor, ("Jullien"), Overture to Rip Van Winkle, '''Winter's Tale Overture; the Royal Northern Sinfonia, Rebecca Miller, conductor. New World Records, 80768-2, 2015. Compact disc.
Dream Land on The Wind Demon and Other 19th century Piano Music. Ivan Davis, piano. New World Records, NW 257, 1976. LP record.; reissued New World Records, 80257-2, 1995. Compact disc.

Productions

Rip Van Winkle (Original, Musical, Comedy), Opera, Music by George F. Bristow; Musical Director: George F. Bristow September 27, 1855 – October 23, 1855
The Beggar's Opera [Revival, Musical, Drama, Opera], Musical Director: George F. Bristow September 14, 1855 – November 3, 1855
The Daughter of St. Mark [Original, Musical, Operetta], Musical Director: George F. Bristow June 18, 1855 – June 28, 1855
The Bohemian Girl [Revival, Musical, Comedy, Opera], Musical Director: George F. Bristow June 2, 1855 – November 3, 1855
A Queen of a Day [Original, Musical, Comedy, Opera], Musical Director: George F. Bristow June 2, 1855 – November 3, 1855

References
Notes

Sources

External links 

George Frederick Bristow  at Music of the United States of America (MUSA)

1825 births
1898 deaths
American male classical composers
American opera composers
Male opera composers
American Romantic composers
Musicians from Brooklyn
American classical violinists
Male classical violinists
Concertmasters
19th-century classical composers
19th-century classical violinists
American male violinists
19th-century American composers
Classical musicians from New York (state)
19th-century American male musicians